Begno  is a village in the administrative district of Gmina Staroźreby, within Płock County, Masovian Voivodeship, in east-central Poland. In 2021, the total population of the village was 91.

References

Villages in Płock County